Space Battle (also known as Space Battles) is a 1978 video game developed by Level IV for the TRS-80 16K Level II microcomputer.

Gameplay
Space Battle is a Star Trek-style game, in which the player take the role of a mercenary ship engaged in combat with hostile alien ships.

Reception
In 80-US, Geo Blank compared the game to Time Trek, and rated its content "Excellent" and its value "Good to very good", concluding that it was "One of the best space war games available." J. Mishcon reviewed Space Battle in The Space Gamer No. 28, commenting that "I believe most gamer will set this aside - a nice try, but not really a challenge. The tactics are just too easily optimized."

Reviews
Moves #55, p32

References

1978 video games
TRS-80 games
TRS-80-only games
Video games based on Star Trek
Video games developed in the United States